Doris Jean Austin (1949 – September 1994) was an American author and journalist.

Early life and education

Doris Jean Austin was born in 1949 in Mobile, Alabama, in the United States. She was raised by her mother and grandmother. When she was six years old, Austin moved with her family to Jersey City, New Jersey, where she attended Lincoln High School. She was influenced to become a writer by her high school English teacher Reverend Ercell F. Webb. She was raised in a strict Baptist household, which would also serve as an inspiration for her work. She died in 1994 of liver cancer.

Career

From 1989 until 1994, Austin taught workshops about fiction at Columbia University and at the Frederick Douglass Creative Arts Center.  She co-founded the Harlem Writers Guild. She left the guild in 1994 and co-founded The New Renaissance Guild. The group was inspired by writers groups during the Harlem Renaissance. Arthur Flowers and Terry McMillan were involved in the group.  For a time she was a reporter for NBC Radio. Her work has been published in Essence, Amsterdam News, and The New York Times.

Austin wrote one novel, After the Garden (1987). The novel pulls inspiration from people that attended the Baptist church Austin attended when young. The book is about "idealism and tainted relationships". Her short story, "Heirs and Orphans," is based on a character in After the Garden, and was featured in the anthology Black Southern Voices. She had additional short stories appear in Street Lights: Illuminating Tales of the Urban Black Experience, which she co-edited.

Legacy

Austin was best friends with Terry McMillan. In McMillan's book, How Stella Got Her Groove Back, the character Delilah was based on Austin. Writer Carolyn Ferrell credits Austin as a mentor.

References

1949 births
1994 deaths
Lincoln High School (New Jersey) alumni
Writers from Mobile, Alabama
Writers from Jersey City, New Jersey
Deaths from liver cancer
American women journalists
African-American women journalists
African-American journalists
African-American writers
Writers from Alabama
20th-century American women writers
20th-century American non-fiction writers
Journalists from Alabama
20th-century American journalists
20th-century African-American women writers
20th-century African-American writers